Aziz Ahmed Chaudhry (born 1 January 1932) is a Pakistani former sports shooter. He competed in two events at the 1964 Summer Olympics.

References

External links
 

1932 births
Possibly living people
Pakistani male sport shooters
Olympic shooters of Pakistan
Shooters at the 1964 Summer Olympics
Place of birth missing (living people)